Erebabraxas is a genus of moths in the family Geometridae. It was erected by Paul Thierry-Mieg in 1907 for the only species in the genus, Erebabraxas metachromata (Walker, 1862). The species is found from Himalayas (India, Nepal, Bhutan) and Vietnam.

References

Geometridae